Michelle Jerott (January 17, 1961 – July 5, 2021) was an American writer of romance novels. She wrote under both her real name and her pen name, Michele Albert. She won a Golden Heart Award, was nominated by Romantic Times for "Best Mainstream Novel" twice, and appeared on the Waldenbook's National Bestseller List. She was a member of the Authors Guild and Novelists, Inc.

Biography

Personal life
Michelle Jerott obtained a degree in Classical archaeology from the University of Michigan. Before writing, she worked as archaeologist. She became a mother and went to work in a research lab, which allowed her time to write.

Michelle lived with her husband in a small town outside Madison, Wisconsin.

Writing career

Her first book, Absolute Trouble, won the Romance Writers of America's 1997 Golden Heart Award for best unpublished contemporary romance. She published her first four books under her name, Michelle Jerott, and later she decided to use the pen name Michele Albert to create a series, "Avalon Investigations", that also was related to her debut book. Her Bodyguard and Getting Her Man were both nominated for Best Mainstream Novel by Romantic Times. Off Limits appeared on the Waldenbook's National Bestseller List.

Awards
Absolute Trouble, her first book, won the Romance Writers of America's 1997 Golden Heart Award for best unpublished contemporary romance
Her Bodyguard was nominated for Best Mainstream Novel by Romantic Times
Getting Her Man was nominated for Best Mainstream Novel by Romantic Times
Off Limits appeared on the Waldenbook's National Bestseller List

Bibliography

As Michelle Jerott

Single novels
All Night Long, 1999/Jan
A Great Catch, 2000/Sep
Her Bodyguard, 2001/Jan

As Michele Albert

Avalon Investigations Series
Absolute Trouble, 1998/Sep (as Michelle Jerott)
Tough Enough 2007/Mar
Getting Her Man, 2002/Oct
Off Limits, 2003/Sep
One Way Out, 2005/Mar
Hide in Plain Sight, 2006/May
Her Last Chance 2008/Apr

References and sources

1961 births
2021 deaths
20th-century American novelists
21st-century American novelists
American romantic fiction writers
American women novelists
University of Michigan College of Literature, Science, and the Arts alumni
Place of birth missing
20th-century American women writers
21st-century American women writers
People from Madison, Wisconsin